Kawran Bazar is a business district and is one of the biggest commodity marketplaces in Dhaka city, the capital of Bangladesh. It is a designated commercial area of the Dhaka North City Corporation. The Biggest local Bangladeshi fruits wholesale market located here.

History
During the Mughal rule, there was a customs check post located near Kawran Bazar. Markets have existed in Kawran Bazar area since the 17th century. In the late 18th century, a market was established in the area by Kawran Singh, a Marwari trader. The market was named Kawran Bazar after him. By late 19th century, it became notable as a marketplace for household products such as pottery and crockery.

Marketplace
It is one of the largest wholesale marketplaces in Dhaka city. It is also one of the largest marketplaces in South Asia. As of 2002, the market had 1255 stores, out of which 55 were owned by the Dhaka City Corporation. In 2002, the wholesale market has a daily revenue of 50 million Bangladeshi taka.

Business district

Kawran Bazaar has emerged as an important business district of Dhaka. The main offices of Prothom Alo, the Daily Star, The Independent, and several other newspapers are located here. Also, the office and studio of television channels Ekushey Television, NTV, ATN Bangla, ATN News, Banglavision and ABC Radio are located at Kawran Bazar. The main campus of Ahsanullah University of Science and Technology was located here.

Kawran Bazaar also has the headquarters for the Trading Corporation of Bangladesh, along with Export Promotion Bureau, EPB of Bangladesh.

References

Bazaars in Bangladesh
Economy of Dhaka
Neighbourhoods in Dhaka